The Vicuña family in Chile became politically influential since the beginning of the 19th century, and played a very significant role in Chilean politics. Among its most prominent members we find:

Francisco Ramón Vicuña Larraín (1775-1849), politician and President of Chile
Manuel Vicuña Larraín (1777-1843), first Archbishop of Santiago de Chile
Mariana de Aguirre y Boza (c.1780- c.1852), First Lady of Chile
Pedro Félix Vicuña Aguirre (1805-1874), politician and journalist
Benjamín Vicuña Mackenna (1831-1886), politician, historian and presidencial candidate in the 1876 election
Claudio Vicuña Guerrero (1833-1907), politician, journalist and presidencial candidate in the 1891 election
Benjamín Vicuña Luco (1978-), actor

References

External links
Genealogical chart of Errázuriz family 

Chilean families
Vicuña family
Chilean families of Basque ancestry